Leslie D. "Les" Donovan, Sr. (May 5, 1936) was a Republican member of the Kansas Senate, representing the 27th district from 1997 to 2017. He was the Assistant Majority Leader in 2001 and was a delegate to the National Republican Convention in 2000. He was a Kansas Representative from 1992 to 1997.

He is an auto dealer from Wichita.

Committee assignments
Donovan served on these legislative committees:
 Assessment and Taxation (chair)
 Judiciary
 Transportation

Sponsored legislation
Legislation sponsored or co-sponsored by Donovan includes:
 An amendment to have supreme court justices' appointments subject to consent of the senate.
 A resolution to create a budget stabilization fund
 A bill regarding campaign finance reform

Major donors
Some of the top contributors to Les Donovan's 2008 campaign, according to the National Institute on Money in State Politics:
 Kansas Republican Senatorial Committee, Koch Industries, Kansas Contractors Association, Kansas Association of Realtors, Kansas Medical Society, Kansas Bankers Association

Financial, insurance and real estate companies were his largest donor group.

Elections

2012
Donovan was unopposed in the 2012 Republican primary. He defeated Democratic nominee Diana Cubbage in the general election, by a margin of 20,773 to 10,922 — 65.5 percent to 34.5 percent. In their primaries, Donovan had won 7,455 votes; Cubbage 1,044 votes.

Cubbage, a Wichita educator, had been unopposed in the 2012 Democratic Primary.
She had been endorsed by the Kansas Education Association, the American Federation of Teachers-Kansas and the AFL-CIO.

References

External links
Kansas Senate
Project Vote Smart profile
 Follow the Money campaign contributions
 1998, 2000, 2004, 2006, 2008

Republican Party Kansas state senators
Living people
1936 births
21st-century American politicians
Conservatism in the United States
20th-century American politicians